The Palmetum is a specialized botanical garden located in the Malakpet area, Hyderabad, in Telangana, which features only one family of plant: the palms.

The garden's collection contains all six subfamilies within the family Arecaceae, with a total of about 120 varieties of 250 trees. It was initiated in 2002 by Chandramohan Reddy, Director of Urban Forestry, Municipal Corporation of Hyderabad. Some of the samples were obtained from Malaysia and Madagascar.

This park is mainly used by senior citizens for walking and young adults use it for jogging and yoga.

List of palm genera
Aiphanes
Archontophoenix: Archontophoenix alexandrae
Areca: Areca catechu
Arenga
Bismarckia: Bismarckia nobilis
Borassus: Borassus flabellifer
Brahea: Brahea armata
Butia
Calamus: Calamus rotang
Carpentaria
Caryota
Chamaedorea
Chamaerops: Chamaerops humilis
Chambeyronia: Chambeyronia macrocarpia
Cocos: Cocos nucifera
Copernicia
Corypha: Corypha unbraculifera
Cyrtostachys
Dictyosperma
Drymophloeus: Drymophloeus oliviformis
Dypsis
Elaeis: Elaeis guineensis
Heterospathe
Howea
Hyophorbe
Latania
Licuala
Livistona
Nypa: Nypa fruticans
Phoenicophorium
Phoenix: Phoenix dactylifera
Pinanga
Pritchardia
Pseudophoenix: Pseudophoenix sargentii
Ptychosperma
Ravenea: Ravenea glauca
Rhapis: Rhapis excelsa
Roystonea
Sabal: Sabal palmetto
Serenoa
Syagrus
Trachycarpus: Trachycarpus fortunei
Trithrinax
Veitchia
Wallichia
Washingtonia: Washingtonia filifera
Wodyetia: Wodyetia bifurcata

Palmetum
Gardens in India
Parks in Hyderabad, India
2002 establishments in Andhra Pradesh